Adcock is an English surname. Notable people with the surname include:

 Alfred Adcock (1916–2005), English cricketer
 Arthur St. John Adcock (1864–1930), English novelist, journalist and poet
 Betty Adcock, American poet
 C. C. Adcock (born 1971), American musician
 Chris Adcock, English badminton player
 Clarence Lionel Adcock (1895–1967), American Army Officer
 Eddie Adcock, American bluegrass musician
 Fleur Adcock (born 1934), New Zealand poet
 Frank Adcock, British engineer, inventor of the Adcock antenna
 Gabby Adcock, English badminton player
 Sir Frank Adcock (1886–1968), English classical historian
 Hugh Adcock (1903–1975), English footballer
 Jamar Adcock (1917–1999), American politician and banker
 Jed Adcock (born 1985), Australian rules footballer
 Joe Adcock (1927–1999), Major League Baseball player
 Joseph Adcock (1864–1914), English cricketer and clergyman
 Levy Adcock, American football player
 Nathan Adcock (baseball), Major League Baseball player
 Neil Adcock (1931–2013), South African cricketer
 William Adcock (1846–1931), Australian journalist
 William Adcock (politician) (1850–1926), American politician and farmer
 Willis Adcock (1922–2003), American chemist and electrical engineer

See also 
 Adcock antenna, antenna arrangement used for direction finding
 An elementary school in the Clark County School District
 Adcock River, river in Western Australia

References 

English-language surnames